William Zachariah Leitner (September 23, 1829 – April 23, 1881) was a lawyer, state senator, state Secretary of State, and a Confederate officer in the American Civil War. Before the Civil War he graduated from South Carolina College in 1849 and taught law to John D. Kennedy. Commanding the Camden Volunteers, being Company E of the 2nd South Carolina Infantry Regiment, he was wounded at Gettysburg. Losing his right leg as result of his injuries; he was forced to resign in 1864 while serving as enrolling officer for the Kershaw District, SC. He was a member of the South Carolina State Senate from Kershaw from 1882-1885. He was elected as Secretary of State for SC in November 1886. He died in Columbia, SC from a sudden heart attack in November, 1888. He served under Governor John Peter Richardson III, another confederate officers during his term. He died from a sudden heart attack while in Columbia, SC. Some of his pall bearers included Gov. John P. Richardson, Ex-Gov. and Gen. Milledge Luke Bonham, and Col. Fitz W. McMaster, previous commander of the 17th SC Infantry.

1829 births
1881 deaths
People from Winnsboro, South Carolina
Confederate States Army officers
People of South Carolina in the American Civil War